The 2000 USC Trojans football team represented the University of Southern California (USC) in the 2000 NCAA Division I-A football season. In their third and final year under head coach Paul Hackett, the Trojans compiled a 5-7 record (2–6 against conference opponents), finished in a three-way tie for last place in the Pacific-10 Conference (Pac-10), and were outscored by their opponents by a combined total of 337 to 309.

This was the last year of Hackett's tenure at USC, and the first year the Trojans had ever finished last in the Pac-10.  After winning the 18th Kickoff Classic against ranked Penn State, the Trojans won their next two non-conference games and were ranked as high as eighth in the AP Poll.  The game against San Jose State was the 500th game USC played in the Coliseum, which they won after trailing 24–12.

They lost their first conference game to Oregon State, breaking their 26-game winning streak against the conference rival, and lost the next four, eventually going 2–6 in conference play.  It placed 8th, tied with California and Washington State.  Petros Papadakis, a team captain for the season and current broadcaster, claims he was "the captain of the worst football team in USC history."

Quarterback Carson Palmer led the team in passing, completing 228 of 415 passes for 2,914 yards with 16 touchdowns and 18 interceptions.  Sultan McCullough led the team in rushing with 227 carries for 1,163 yards and six touchdowns. Kareem Kelly led the team in receiving yards with 55 catches for 796 yards and four touchdowns.

Schedule

Game summaries

Penn State

Roster

Rankings

Awards
No All-Pac-10 selections

References

USC
USC Trojans football seasons
USC Trojans football